Alloformica is a genus of ants in the subfamily Formicinae. The genus was first described as a subgenus of Proformica by Dlussky (1969), later to be synonymized under Proformica by Brown (1973), and finally revived and raised to genus rank by Dlussky & Fedoseeva (1988). Its species are known only from a few localities.

Species
 Alloformica aberrans (Mayr, 1877)
 Alloformica flavicornis (Kuznetsov-Ugamsky, 1926)
 Alloformica nitidior (Forel, 1904)
 Alloformica obscurior Dlussky, Soyunov & Zabelin, 1990

References

External links

Formicinae
Ant genera